Duhring is an unincorporated community in Mercer County, West Virginia, United States.

The community was named after an early settler.

References

Unincorporated communities in Mercer County, West Virginia
Unincorporated communities in West Virginia